Norway competed at the 1988 Summer Paralympics in Seoul, South Korea. 34 competitors from Norway won 36 medals including 11 gold, 11 silver and 14 bronze and finished 23rd in the medal table.

Medalists

See also 
 Norway at the Paralympics
 Norway at the 1988 Summer Olympics

References 

Norway at the Paralympics
1988 in Norwegian sport
Nations at the 1988 Summer Paralympics